The political history of Mysore and Coorg (1761–1799) is the political history of the contiguous historical regions of Mysore State and Coorg province on the Deccan Plateau in west-central peninsular India from the time of the rise of Haidar Ali in 1761 to that of the death of his son Tipu Sultan in 1799.

Sources and historiography

There is very little contemporaneous documentation of the pre-1760 period of Mysore's history, especially the last century of that period.

A Wodeyar dynasty genealogy, the Maisüru Maharajara Vamsävali of Tirumalarya, was composed in Kannada during the period 1710–1715, and was claimed to be based on all the then-extant inscriptions in the region.  Another genealogy, Kalale Doregala Vamsävali, of the Delvoys, the near-hereditary chief ministers of Mysore, was composed around the turn of the 19th century.  However, neither manuscript provides information about administration, economy or military capability.  The ruling dynasty's origins, especially as expounded in later palace genealogies, are also of doubtful accuracy; this is, in part, because the Wodeyars, who were reinstated by the British on the Mysore gaddi in 1799, to preside over a fragile sovereignty, "obsessively" attempted to demonstrate their "unbroken" royal lineage, to bolster their then uncertain status.

The earliest manuscript offering clues to governance and military conflict in the pre-1760 Mysore, seems to be , an annual letter written in Portuguese by a Mysore-based Jesuit missionary, Joachim Dias, and addressed to his Provincial superior. Around this time, French accounts of the Anglo-Mysore wars appeared as well, and included , a history of the wars by Joseph-François Michaud, another Jesuit priest.

Wilks claimed to have based his history on various Kannada documents, not only the ones mentioned above, but also many that have not survived. By the end of the period of British Commissionership of Mysore (1831–1881), many English language works had begun to appear on a variety of Mysore-related subjects.

See also
 Princely state
 Political history of Mysore and Coorg (1565–1760)
 Political history of Mysore and Coorg (1800–1947)
 Anglo-Mysore Wars
 Kingdom of Mysore

Notes

References

Contemporary sources

Classic sources

 
 
 
 
 
 
 
 
 
 
 
 

Political history of Karnataka
History of Mysore
Coorg